Stephen C. Bishop (born September 14, 1970) is an American actor and retired baseball player.

Baseball career
Bishop attended the University of California, Riverside, where he played baseball for the Highlanders from 1991–1992.  After college he signed a free agent contract with the Atlanta Braves and played in 20 games for Atlanta's affiliate in the Pioneer League in 1993. In 1994, he played for the Sioux Falls Canaries and the St. Paul Saints of the Northern League, and in 1995 he played for the High Desert Mavericks, the advanced A ball affiliate for the Baltimore Orioles.

Acting career
He played Patrick on the television show Imposters, which aired on Bravo. He plays David Paulk in the television show Being Mary Jane. He also appeared on the television series Lost, Girlfriends, and The Game, and in the independent film Americanese. He appeared in the movie The Rundown with The Rock. Bishop also played David Justice in Moneyball, which was released on September 23, 2011.
He was in the 2015 movie With This Ring where he played 'Nate Adamson' and starred alongside Regina Hall, Jill Scott and Eve (rapper). He appeared in Grey's Anatomy Season 4 Episode 16 Freedom part 1. In 2017, he played the role of Michael Roland in the psychological thriller 'Til Death Do Us Part alongside Taye Diggs.

On October 19, 2018, it was announced that Bishop had been cast in a recurring role on Criminal Minds as Supervisory Special agent Andrew Mendoza, who will be a love interest for Emily Prentiss.

In July 2020, Bishop starred in the Netflix psychological thriller Fatal Affair.

Personal life

On November 29, 2017, he and his partner, model Jesiree Dizon, welcomed their first child together Charli Kekuʻulani. Jesiree Dizon has a child from a previous relationship and a third child with Shemar Moore. Stephen wed fiancee Jasmine Bishop in October 2022 in a courthouse but they divorced in Jan 2023, Their daughter Ellora Ann-Marie Bishop-Myers was born on January 31, 2023

Filmography

References

External links

1970 births
21st-century American male actors
African-American baseball players
African-American male actors
American male film actors
American male television actors
High Desert Mavericks players
Idaho Falls Braves players
Living people
Place of birth missing (living people)
Sioux Falls Canaries players
St. Paul Saints (Northwestern League) players
UC Riverside Highlanders baseball players
21st-century African-American sportspeople
20th-century African-American sportspeople